"Alcohol" is a song written and recorded by American country music singer Brad Paisley.  It was released on May 9, 2005, as the lead single from Paisley's album Time Well Wasted (2005), reaching number 4 on the Billboard Hot Country Songs charts.  It also peaked at number 28 on the U.S. Billboard Hot 100. It was nominated for two Grammys: Best Country Song and Best Country Male Vocal. Joseph Gordon-Levitt covered it in 2011.

Content
The song is a mid-tempo in 6/8 time signature and the key of C major, but down tuned in the original recording. In the song, Paisley personifies alcoholic beverages in general, describing the various influences that the beverages have on certain people ("Helping white people dance"), ultimately stating "You'll have some of the best times you'll never remember, with me, Alcohol".

Critical reception
Kevin John Coyne, reviewing the song for Country Universe, gave it a positive rating. He says that Paisley pulls the song off with "good taste and great humor."

Music video
The music video was directed by Jim Shea. It features Little Jimmy Dickens, who puts a lampshade on his head. It was released in June 2005. A newer, 3D live version of the video, directed by Scott Scovill, was released in late 2010.

Chart performance
The song debuted at number 60 on the U.S. Billboard Hot Country Singles & Tracks for the week ending May 7, 2005.

Year-end charts

Certifications

References

2005 singles
2005 songs
Brad Paisley songs
Songs written by Brad Paisley
Songs about alcohol
Song recordings produced by Frank Rogers (record producer)
Arista Nashville singles